Ola Vigen Hattestad (born 19 April 1982) is a former Norwegian cross-country skier who competed from 2002 through 2018. Competing in three Winter Olympics, he became Olympic champion in the individual sprint event at Sochi in 2014.

Career
Hattestad has 13 individual World Cup victories, all in the sprint events. He also won the 2007–08, 2008–09 and 2013–14 World Cup in the sprint discipline and finished third in the overall 2008–2009 world cup.

Hattestad won two gold medals at the 2009 World Championships, earning them in the individual and team sprint events. Having ranked sixth in the qualifying round, Hattestad progressed through the quarterfinals and semifinals by winning each round, eventually taking the title ahead of fellow Norwegian Johan Kjølstad. The subsequent day, the two of them teamed up for the team sprint and won another gold medal.

He was initially not qualified for the Norwegian team for the 2014 Winter Olympics, but this changed before the opening individual sprint, where he emerged victorious after the fastest prologue, and winning the quarterfinal, semifinal and final.

On 3 May 2018, he announced his retirement from cross-country skiing.

Cross-country skiing results
All results are sourced from the International Ski Federation (FIS).

Olympic Games
 1 medal – (1 gold)

World Championships
 4 medals – (2 gold, 1 silver, 1 bronze)

World Cup

Season titles
 3 titles – (3 sprint)

Season standings

Individual podiums
 13 victories – (13 ) 
 32 podiums – (31 , 1 )

Team podiums
 4 victories – (4 ) 
 6 podiums – (6 )

References

External links
 
 
 

1982 births
Cross-country skiers at the 2006 Winter Olympics
Cross-country skiers at the 2010 Winter Olympics
Cross-country skiers at the 2014 Winter Olympics
Living people
Norwegian male cross-country skiers
Olympic cross-country skiers of Norway
FIS Nordic World Ski Championships medalists in cross-country skiing
Medalists at the 2014 Winter Olympics
Olympic gold medalists for Norway
Olympic medalists in cross-country skiing
People from Askim
Sportspeople from Viken (county)
21st-century Norwegian people